Goran Stojiljković (Serbian Cyrillic: Горан Cтojиљкoвић; born 14 December 1970 in Leskovac) is a Serbian retired footballer who played as a forward.

Football career
After making his professional debuts with FK Radnički Niš at the age of 17, and remaining there for seven years, Stojiljković signed with Red Star Belgrade. In his only season with the capital side he was relatively used as the team won the double, scoring seven goals in the league.

In the 1995 summer Stojiljković moved abroad, joining Spanish second division club Getafe CF. He would spend the next two seasons in the same country and level, with as many teams, being relatively played as RCD Mallorca returned to La Liga in 1997; at the Balearic Islands outfit, he reunited with countryman – and former Red Star teammate – Jovan Stanković.

Subsequently, Stojiljković returned to his country, where he played for a further five years in representation of three teams until his retirement in 2003. This included a second spell with Radnički Niš.

External links
 Stats and profile at SrbijaFudbal 
 

Living people
1970 births
Sportspeople from Leskovac
Yugoslav footballers
Serbian footballers
Association football forwards
FK Radnički Niš players
Red Star Belgrade footballers
FK Vojvodina players
Segunda División players
Getafe CF footballers
RCD Mallorca players
CD Leganés players
Serbian expatriate footballers
Expatriate footballers in Spain